August Julius Leps (2 January 1895 Adavere Parish (now Põltsamaa Parish, Kreis Fellin – 26 February 1972 Stockholm) was an Estonian politician. He was a member of the IV and V Riigikogu, representing the Farmers' Assemblies. He was a member of the Riigikogu since 20 May 1930. He replaced Karl-Eduard Pajos.

References

1895 births
1972 deaths
People from Põltsamaa Parish
People from Kreis Fellin
Farmers' Assemblies politicians
Members of the Riigikogu, 1929–1932
Members of the Riigikogu, 1932–1934
Estonian World War II refugees
Estonian emigrants to Sweden